The 1995–96 Coppa Italia, the 49th staging of the major domestic tournament in Italian football, won by Fiorentina, took place from 20 August 1995 to 18 March 1996.

First round

p=after penalty shoot-out

Second round 

p=after penalty shoot-out

Third round

Knockout stage

Quarter-finals

p=after penalty shoot-out

Semi-finals

Bologna vs. Atalanta

Fiorentina vs. Internazionale

Final

First leg

Second leg

Fiorentina won 3–0 on aggregate.

Top goalscorers 

1995-96
Coppa Italia
Italy